Cymindis adusta is a species of ground beetle in the subfamily Harpalinae. It was described by L. Redtenbacher in 1843.

References

adusta
Beetles described in 1843